Marqués del Duero, also known as Monumento al Marqués del Duero ("Monument to the Marquis of the Duero"), is an instance of public art located in Madrid, Spain. Erected on the centre of the Plaza del Doctor Marañón, the monument consists of a bronze equestrian statue representing Manuel Gutiérrez de la Concha e Irigoyen—a general who stood out in the fight against Carlism—on a stone pedestal decorated with two reliefs.

History and description 
Reportedly the first equestrian statue cast in Spain since the 17th century, the bronze was cast in Seville, from cannons loaned by the Spanish State. Additional costs were funded via a nation-wide popular subscription.

One of the reliefs depicts the Spanish intervention in the neighbouring kingdom of Portugal in 1847 during the Portuguese Civil War, with Gutiérrez de la Concha entering the city of Porto followed by his staff, in the act of being received by the local leader of the insurrectionists, surrounded by his own people. This peacemaking role granted him a Grand Collar of the Order of the Tower and the Sword on the part of the Portuguese Government, and the nobiliary title of Marquis of Duero (Grandee of Spain) on that of Spain.

In bronze letters, the following inscription reads: Al capitán general, Marqués del Duero ("to the Captain General, Marquis del Duero"). 

The statue was placed on a marble base with three steps as a base upon its inauguration, surrounded by several rows of flower pots. It was unveiled on 27 June 1885.

References 
Citations

Bibliography
 
 

Equestrian statues in Madrid
Monuments and memorials in Madrid
Outdoor sculptures in Madrid
Sculptures of men in Spain
Statues of military officers
Bronze sculptures in Spain
Buildings and structures in El Viso neighborhood, Madrid